Return to Sender is a 2004 film written by Neal Purvis and Robert Wade and directed by Bille August. It was also released on video under the title Convicted. The film stars Aidan Quinn, Connie Nielsen and Kelly Preston.

Aidan Quinn was nominated for a 2005 IFTA Best Actor in a Feature Film award for his performance. Quinn plays an unscrupulous attorney who is challenged by Nielsen, his latest client.

Plot
Quinn's character, a jaded ex-lawyer, has been befriending and exploiting death row convicts and selling their final letters to the media.  While attempting to foster his relationship with Nielsen's character, he becomes convinced that she is innocent.

Cast

Reception
Todd McCarthy of Variety gave the film a negative review and suggested it "should be returned to maker" and says the film shows "absolutely no feel for its characters or setting, pic doesn't convince on any level".

References

External links 
   Return to Sender at BFI
   Return to Sender at Lumiere
 
 

2004 films
2004 psychological thriller films
American psychological thriller films
British psychological thriller films
Danish thriller films
English-language Danish films
Films scored by Harry Gregson-Williams
Films about capital punishment
Films about lawyers
Films directed by Bille August
Number 9 Films films
2000s English-language films
2000s American films
2000s British films